Grigoriy Ivanovich Shchedrin  (1912–1995) was a Soviet Navy submarine commander and admiral. He was a Hero of the Soviet Union

Shchedrin was born in Tuapse and joined the merchant navy as a fourteen-year-old. He continued his education at a marine college and graduated as a navigator in 1932.

Shchedrin joined the navy's submarine service in 1934. He commanded boats M-5 and Shch-110 and won first prize in the Soviet Pacific Fleet in 1939 to 1941. In 1941 he was given command of the new Soviet S-class submarine S-56.

In 1942 Shchedrin led a flotilla of six submarines from the Pacific fleet to join the Red Banner Northern Fleet across the Pacific and Atlantic Oceans via the Panama Canal. This squadron reached Polyarnyy in March 1943. The S-56 carried out 8 war patrols sinking two transports and two warships. Shchedrin was awarded the Hero of the Soviet Union on 5 November 1944.

Shchedrin was chief of staff of the Baltic Fleet's 2nd submarine squadron from 1946–1950. In 1950-53 he was base commander at Świnoujście, Poland. In 1954 he graduated from the general staff academy with the gold medal and was promoted to vice admiral. He commanded the Kamchatka Flotilla of the Pacific Fleet until 1959 when he joined Navy staff. He was editor of the navy's magazine Morskoy Sbornik (Морской сборник) between 1969 and 1973.

Shchedrin retired in 1973 and died in Moscow in 1995.

Honours and awards
 Hero of the Soviet Union
 Order of Lenin
 Order of the Red Banner, four times
 Order of Nakhimov, 2nd class
 Order of the Patriotic War, 1st class
 Order of the Red Banner of Labour
 Order of the Red Star
 Medal "For the Victory over Germany in the Great Patriotic War 1941–1945"

References
page in Russian
Морозов, М. Э., Кулагин, К. Л. «Эски» в бою. Подводные лодки Маринеско, Щедрина, Лисина. — М.: Коллекция, Яуза, ЭКСМО, 2008. — 128 с. — 

1912 births
1995 deaths
People from Tuapse
People from Black Sea Governorate
Soviet admirals
Soviet submarine commanders
Soviet military personnel of World War II
Heroes of the Soviet Union
Recipients of the Order of Lenin
Recipients of the Order of the Red Banner
Recipients of the Order of Nakhimov, 2nd class
Recipients of the Medal of Zhukov
Military Academy of the General Staff of the Armed Forces of the Soviet Union alumni
N. G. Kuznetsov Naval Academy alumni